A mandrin is a metal guide for flexible catheters. It is a stiff wire or stylet inserted into the soft catheter and gives it shape and firmness while passing through a hollow tubular structure. It is sometimes called a mandrel, although mandrel may refer to other types of instruments as well.

See also

References

Catheters